Harvey Jewell (*May 26, 1820 – December 8, 1881) was a U.S. lawyer and politician who served as the Speaker of the Massachusetts House of Representatives from 1868 to 1871. Jewell was born in Winchester, New Hampshire on May 26, 1820, the first of ten children born to Pliny and Emily Alexander Jewell. His younger brother, Marshall Jewell (1825-1883) would later be elected Governor of Connecticut and would serve as President Grant's United States Postmaster General.

Jewell graduated from Dartmouth College in 1844. He moved to Boston, Massachusetts, in 1847 where he began his legal career and became active in local and state politics. Jewell wed Susan A. Bradley on December 26, 1849. Jewell was originally a Whig until the dissolution of the party in the 1850s and later became a Republican. In 1861 he was elected to the Massachusetts House of Representatives and was re-elected for the 1862 session. He returned again to serve from 1866 until 1871, serving his last four 1-year terms as Speaker. Jewell acquired a reputation for "able and impartial rulings." After his retirement from the general court, he served on the Court of Commissioners of Alabama Claims from 1875 to 1876.

At his residence on Beacon Street in Boston, he owned "a magnificent library, stored with the choicest and most valuable gems of literature." Jewell was an enthusiastic fisherman, and an expert in the capture of striped bass off the rocks at Swampscott, Massachusetts, where he had a summer cottage.

Jewell died in Boston at the age of 61 on December 8, 1881.

See also
 89th Massachusetts General Court (1868)
 90th Massachusetts General Court (1869)
 91st Massachusetts General Court (1870)
 92nd Massachusetts General Court (1871)

References
The 1868 guide to the MA legislature indicated his birth on May 26 while an alumni sketch of Dartmouth stated June 26 (needs further research).

Dartmouth College alumni
Massachusetts lawyers
Massachusetts Whigs
19th-century American politicians
Republican Party members of the Massachusetts House of Representatives
Speakers of the Massachusetts House of Representatives
People from Winchester, New Hampshire
People from Swampscott, Massachusetts
Politicians from Boston
1820 births
1881 deaths
19th-century American lawyers